Zakari Gourouza (born 8 June 1982) is a Nigerien judoka from Dosso. He competes in the men's 60 kg category. At the 2012 Summer Olympics, he was defeated in the second round by Russian Arsen Galstyan, who would win gold in the event, having defeated Honduran Kenny Godoy in the first round.  Zakari Gourouza was the first Nigerien athlete to compete in the 2012 London games.

References

External links
 

Nigerien male judoka
1982 births
Living people
Olympic judoka of Niger
Judoka at the 2012 Summer Olympics